Conopomorpha euphanes is a moth of the family Gracillariidae. It is known from South Africa and Namibia.

The larvae feed on Combretum apiculatum. They probably mine the leaves of their host plant.

References

Conopomorpha
Moths of Africa
Insects of Namibia
Moths described in 1961